BC Šilutė is a professional Šilutė, Lithuania basketball club, currently playing in National Basketball League. BC Šilutė was founded in 1990 and currently is the oldest participant in NKL. From 1993 to 1999 seasons, BC Šilutė played in Lithuania super basketball league LKL, their highest achievement in LKL was Bronze medal. During 2004-2005 season, BC Šilutė won LKAL championship.

Club achievements 
1993-1994 season: LKL 7th place
1994-1995 season: LKL 5th place
1995-1996 season: LKL 4th place/  FIBA Korać cup 1/16 
1996-1997 season: LKL 3rd place 
1997-1998 season: LKL 6th place 
1998-1999 season: LKL 10th place
1999-2000 season: LKAL 3rd place 
2000-2001 season: LKAL 6th place
2001-2002 season: LKAL 7th place
 2002-2003 season: LKAL 2nd place
 2003-2004 season: LKAL 5-8th place (quarter-finals)
 2004-2005 season: LKAL 1st place
 2005-2006 season: NKL 13th place
 2006-2007 season: NKL 4th place
 2007-2008 season: NKL 5th place
 2008-2009 season: NKL 15th place
 2009-2010 season: NKL 15th place
 2010-2011 season: NKL 11th place 
 2011-2012 season: NKL 14th place
 2012-2013 season: NKL 16th place 
 2013-2014 season: NKL 8th place (Quarterfinals)
 2014-2015 season: NKL 13th place
 2015-2016 season: NKL 11th place
 2016-2017 season: NKL 7th place
 2017-2018 season: NKL 4th place (Quarterfinals)
 2018-2019 season: NKL 12th place
 2019-2020 season: NKL 3rd place

Team roster

Notable players and coaches 
  Mindaugas Timinskas (1997–1998) - player
  Robertas Kuncaitis (2002–2004) - Head coach
  Kęstutis Kemzūra (1996–1998) - player
  Marijonas Petravičius (1997–1998) - player
  Žydrūnas Stankus (1995–1998) - player
  Marius Kasiulevičius (2004–2005) - player
  Evaldas Dainys (2002–2003) - player
  Jonas Elvikis (2002–2003) - player

External links 
 BC Šilutė NKLyga.lt 

Silute
Šilutė
Basketball teams established in 1990
1990 establishments in Lithuania
National Basketball League (Lithuania) teams